Ulongwe Airport  is an airport serving Ulongwe, Mozambique.

See also

List of airports in Mozambique

References

External links

Airports in Mozambique